Molorchus is a genus of longhorn beetles in the tribe Molorchini.

Subgenera and species
BioLib includes:
subgenus Caenoptera Thomson, 1859
 Molorchus abieticola Holzschuh, 2007
 Molorchus asperanus Holzschuh, 1989
 Molorchus aureomaculatus Gressitt & Rondon, 1970
 Molorchus carus Holzschuh, 1999
 Molorchus changi Gressitt, 1951
 Molorchus eburneus Linsley, 1931
 Molorchus foveolus Holzschuh, 1998
 Molorchus ikedai Takakuwa, 1984
 Molorchus juglandis Sama, 1982
 Molorchus minor (Linnaeus, 1758) - the "Spruce Shortwing Beetle"
 Molorchus monticola Plavilstshikov, 1931
 Molorchus pallidipennis Heyden, 1887
 Molorchus pinivorus Takakuwa & Ikeda, 1979
 Molorchus relictus Niisato, 1996
subgenus Epanioglaphyra Niisato, 1986
 Molorchus kurosawai (Niisato, 1986)
subgenus Molorchus Fabricius, 1793

 Molorchus adachii Takakuwa & Fujita, 1981
 Molorchus angularis (Holzschuh, 2006)
 Molorchus approximans (Holzschuh, 2007)
 Molorchus bassettii (Sama, 1992)
 Molorchus bimaculatus Say, 1824
 Molorchus chalybeellus (Holzschuh, 2007)
 Molorchus cobaltinus Hayashi, 1963
 Molorchus cyanescens Gressitt, 1951
 Molorchus fraudulentus (Holzschuh, 2006)
 Molorchus gilvitarsis (Holzschuh, 2006)
 Molorchus gracilis Hayashi, 1949
 Molorchus horaki (Holzschuh, 1992)
 Molorchus ishiharai Ohbayashi, 1936
 Molorchus ivorensis (Adlbauer, 2004)
 Molorchus jiuyetanus (Hayashi, 1984)
 Molorchus kiesenwetteri Mulsant & Rey, 1861
 Molorchus kiyoymai Hayashi, 1974
 Molorchus kobotokensis Ohbayashi, 1963
 Molorchus kojimai (Matsushita, 1939)
 Molorchus laetus Holzschuh, 2003
 Molorchus lampros (Holzschuh, 2006)
 Molorchus lectus (Holzschuh, 2006)
 Molorchus liui Gressitt, 1948
 Molorchus liukueiensis (Hayashi, 1984)
 Molorchus longicollis LeConte, 1873
 Molorchus luzonicus Vives, 2015
 Molorchus malmusii (Sama, 1994)
 Molorchus marmottani Brisout de Barneville, 1863
 Molorchus molorchoides (Holzschuh, 1984)
 Molorchus moraveci (Holzschuh, 2006)
 Molorchus morii Makihara, 1983
 Molorchus nitidus Obika, 1973
 Molorchus nobilitatus (Holzschuh, 2007)
 Molorchus plagiatus Reiche, 1877
 Molorchus plavilstshikovi Gressitt, 1951
 Molorchus principatus (Holzschuh, 2007)
 Molorchus schmidti Ganglbauer, 1883
 Molorchus serrus (Holzschuh, 2006)
 Molorchus shibatai Hayashi, 1961
 Molorchus shimai Hayashi & Makihara, 1981
 Molorchus sidus (Newman, 1840)
 Molorchus sikkimanus Holzschuh, 2003
 Molorchus starki Shabliovsky, 1936
 Molorchus sterbai Adlabuer, 1988
 Molorchus strangulatus (Holzschuh, 2007)
 Molorchus takeuchii (Ohbayashi, 1937)
 Molorchus taprobanicus Gahan, 1906
 Molorchus tenuitarsis Holzschuh, 1981
 Molorchus tjanschanicus Plavilstshikov, 1959
 Molorchus umbellatarum (Schreber, 1759) - type species
 Molorchus verus (Holzschuh, 2007)
 Molorchus viridicollis Heller, 1924
 Molorchus watani (Kano, 1933)
 Molorchus yui Hayashi, 1984

subgenus Nathrioglaphyra Sama, 1995
 Molorchus alashanicus Semenov & Plavilstshikov, 1936
 Molorchus heptapotamicus Plavilstshikov, 1940
subgenus Yamatoglaphyra Niisato, 2006
 Molorchus hattorii Ohbayashi, 1953

References

External links
 
 

Cerambycidae genera